Lubiatów may refer to the following villages in Poland:
Lubiatów, Środa Śląska County in Lower Silesian Voivodeship (south-west Poland)
Lubiatów, Złotoryja County in Lower Silesian Voivodeship (south-west Poland)
Lubiatów, Łódź Voivodeship (central Poland)
Lubiatów, Krosno Odrzańskie County in Lubusz Voivodeship (west Poland)
Lubiatów, Strzelce-Drezdenko County in Lubusz Voivodeship (west Poland)
Lubiatów, Wschowa County in Lubusz Voivodeship (west Poland)
Lubiatów, Opole Voivodeship (south-west Poland)